Wet is the twenty-first  studio album released by Barbra Streisand in 1979. The album is a concept album of sorts with all the songs referring to, or expressing different interpretations of, water.  Wet is also the first and the last word sung on the album.

The album was a major success for Streisand, propelled by the album's US No. 1 hit single, "No More Tears (Enough Is Enough)", a duet with American disco singer Donna Summer which underwent a retitling and change of emphasis in order to qualify under the water theme. Streisand also scored a top 10 US Adult Contemporary hit with the follow up single "Kiss Me In The Rain."

There are two covers on the album: the 1940s standard "Come Rain or Come Shine" and the Bobby Darin classic "Splish Splash", which features background vocals by Toto lead singer Bobby Kimball.

Commercial performance 
The album peaked at No. 7 on the US, Canadian and Australian charts and has been certified as Platinum by the RIAA. According to the liner notes of Barbra's  retrospective box set Just for the Record..., the album also received a record certification in New Zealand.

Track listing

Singles
 "No More Tears (Enough Is Enough) {duet with Donna Summer}" / "Wet" (1979) 
 "No More Tears (Enough Is Enough) {duet with Donna Summer} (12-inch disco single)" (1979) 
 "Kiss Me In the Rain" / "I Ain't Gonna Cry Tonight" (1979)

Personnel
Barbra Streisand – vocals
Dan Ferguson – acoustic guitar 
Steve Lukather, Jay Graydon, Larry Carlton – electric guitar
David Hungate, Neil Stubenhaus – bass guitar
Ian Underwood, Michael Boddicker – synthesizer
Ed Greene, Jeff Porcaro, Rick Shlosser, Steve Schaeffer, James Gadson – drums
Richard Tee, David Foster, Bill Payne, Lincoln Mayorga, Michael Lang – piano
Jai Winding, Alan Broadbent – Fender Rhodes, piano
Greg Mathieson – piano, Fender Rhodes, synthesizer
Bobbye Hall, Gary Coleman, Paulinho da Costa – percussion
Tom Scott – saxophone
Gayle Levant – harp
Bobby Kimball, Tom Kelly, Bill Champlin, Julia Waters, Maxine Waters, Luther Waters - backing vocals
Lee Holdridge, Lalo Schifrin, Nick De Caro, Marvin Hamlisch, Charlie Calello, Greg Mathieson  – arrangements, conducting

Charts

Weekly charts

Year-end charts

Certifications

References

Barbra Streisand albums
1979 albums
Albums conducted by Charles Calello
Albums conducted by Lee Holdridge
Albums arranged by Charles Calello
Albums arranged by Lee Holdridge
Albums produced by Gary Klein (producer)
Columbia Records albums
Albums recorded at Capitol Studios
Concept albums